Edward Michael Easley (born December 21, 1985) is an American former professional baseball catcher who played for the St. Louis Cardinals of Major League Baseball (MLB) in 2015.

High school and college
Easley attended Olive Branch High School, where he was an All-American and a 2-time All-State catcher for the Conquistadors. He had a .469 batting average with 12 home runs and 55 runs batted in (RBIs) in 2004, his senior year, earning him the Mississippi Gatorade Player of the Year award.

Easley played college baseball at Mississippi State University for the Mississippi State Bulldogs baseball team. In his freshman year of 2005, he split time at third base and catcher in 62 games, hitting .296 with three home runs and 32 RBIs. After the 2005 season, he played collegiate summer baseball with the Wareham Gatemen of the Cape Cod Baseball League (CCBL). In his sophomore year of 2006, he hit .336 with four home runs, 42 RBIs, and 18 doubles. After the 2006 season, he returned to the CCBL to play for the Chatham A's. In his junior year, he hit .358 with 12 home runs and 68 RBIs. He won the Johnny Bench Award, beating out Buster Posey and Matt Wieters. Easley was also the 2007 recipient of the Cellular South Ferriss Trophy (now the C Spire Ferriss Trophy), awarded annually to Mississippi's top collegiate baseball player.

Professional career

Arizona Diamondbacks
Easley was drafted by the Arizona Diamondbacks in the supplemental first round (61st overall) of the 2007 Major League Baseball Draft, and received a $531,000 signing bonus. Easley was assigned to the Yakima Bears of the Class A-Short Season Northwest League, where in 33 games at catcher and first base, he hit .250 with six home runs and 20 RBIs. Easley played 2008 with the Visalia Oaks of the Class A-Advanced California League, where in 118 games between catcher, first base and third base with the Oaks, he hit .247 with six home runs, 53 RBIs, and 20 doubles. Easley was  Visalia's Opening Day third baseman in 2009, as Konrad Schmidt was their starting catcher. In 106 games with Visalia (now named the Rawhide), he hit .228 with three home runs, 38 RBIs and 18 doubles. Easley began 2010 with the Mobile BayBears of the Class AA Southern League, where he hit .259 in 55 games as the backup to Schmidt. On August 4, Easley earned a promotion to the Reno Aces of the Class AAA Pacific Coast League (PCL) to end the year. In 17 games with the Aces, he hit .188 with seven RBIs. After the season, Easley played with the Scottsdale Scorpions of the Arizona Fall League, where he hit 5-for-21 (.238) in seven games.

Easley was the BayBears' main catcher in 2011, where in 83 games, he hit .273 with four home runs, 37 RBIs and 16 doubles. He was Mobile's Opening Day catcher in 2012, but played in fewer games than their other catcher, Rossmel Perez. In 67 games with the BayBears in 2012, he hit .265 with two home runs and 23 RBIs. Easley played for Reno in 2013, where he was used, along with Tuffy Gosewisch, at catcher. He was named the Diamondbacks' Minor League Co-Player of the Month in August, when he hit .402 with two home runs, 15 RBIs and 14 runs. In 87 games with the Aces in 2013, he hit .334 with six home runs, 49 RBIs, 39 runs and 22 doubles. He threw out a career-high 35.7% of would-be base stealers. After the season, he became a free agent.

St. Louis Cardinals
Easley signed a minor league deal with the St. Louis Cardinals on November 18, 2013. The Cardinals assigned him to the Memphis Redbirds of the PCL at the start of the 2014 season. He was called up for the first time on April 10, 2015, as fellow catcher Tony Cruz was placed on the paternity list. Easley made his MLB debut on May 29 against the Los Angeles Dodgers, appearing as a pinch hitter and reaching base on an error. He had his first MLB start on October 4, catching an entire game against the Atlanta Braves. With the 2015 St. Louis Cardinals, Easley appeared in four games, and was hitless in six at bats. In the 2015 offseason, Easley elected free agency.

Pittsburgh Pirates
Easley signed a minor league contract with the Pittsburgh Pirates in January 2016, and the Pirates invited Easley to spring training. He played for the Class AAA Indianapolis Indians, and was released on June 26, 2016.

Personal life
During the offseason, Easley runs a baseball camp located at Olive Branch High School for 6–18 year olds.

References

External links

1985 births
Baseball players from Memphis, Tennessee
Chatham Anglers players
Indianapolis Indians players
Living people
Major League Baseball catchers
Memphis Redbirds players
Mississippi State Bulldogs baseball players
Mobile BayBears players
People from Olive Branch, Mississippi
Reno Aces players
Scottsdale Scorpions players
St. Louis Cardinals players
Visalia Oaks players
Visalia Rawhide players
Wareham Gatemen players
Yakima Bears players